The Munster Hurler of the Year is an annual award given to the player who is adjudged to have been the best during the Munster Senior Championship. The current holder is Séamus Harnedy, who won the award for his performances throughout the 2018 Munster Championship for Cork.

Winners

References

Munster GAA
Hurling awards